

418001–418100 

|-bgcolor=#f2f2f2
| colspan=4 align=center | 
|}

418101–418200 

|-bgcolor=#f2f2f2
| colspan=4 align=center | 
|}

418201–418300 

|-id=220
| 418220 Kestutis ||  || Kestutis (1297–1382) was monarch of medieval Lithuania. || 
|}

418301–418400 

|-bgcolor=#f2f2f2
| colspan=4 align=center | 
|}

418401–418500 

|-id=419
| 418419 Lacanto ||  || The Jesuit school in the medieval town of Porrentruy, Switzerland, was founded in 1591 by the bishop of Basel, Jacques-Christophe Blarer of Wartensee. In 1979 the old school became the Lycée cantonal, which is nicknamed "La Canto" by students. The discoverer has taught physics there for more than thirty years. || 
|}

418501–418600 

|-id=532
| 418532 Saruman ||  || Saruman is a fictional character in J. R. R. Tolkien's fantasy novel "The Lord of the Rings". In the film version, the role of Saruman was played by actor Christopher Lee. || 
|}

418601–418700 

|-id=689
| 418689 Gema ||  || The Asociación deportiva GEMA (Grupo de Espeleólogia Murcielago Alegre), is a speleology group based in Gijon, Asturias, Spain. Founded in the late 1960s by a group of amateurs, generations of its members have explored many caves in the karst massif of Picos de Europa, in northern Spain. || 
|}

418701–418800 

|-bgcolor=#f2f2f2
| colspan=4 align=center | 
|}

418801–418900 

|-id=891
| 418891 Vizi ||  || Szilveszter E. Vizi (born 1936), a Hungarian physician, neuroscientist, pharmacologist and university professor || 
|}

418901–419000 

|-bgcolor=#f2f2f2
| colspan=4 align=center | 
|}

References 

418001-419000